The Sports Club Dynamo Berlin  was an East German sports club that existed from 1954 to 1991. It was the largest sports club of SV Dynamo, the sports association of the security agencies. The club was disbanded after German reunification and eventually succeeded by sports club SC Berlin.

Sporting spectrum
The sports club offered the following kinds of sport in the 1980s: team handball, athletics, gymnastics, cycling, speed skating, racewalking, figure skating, ice hockey, fencing, boxing, and volleyball. The departments in equestrianism, modern pentathlon and parachuting were separated from the sports club in 1956 and merged into the new sports club SC Dynamo Hoppegarten in Hoppegarten. The football department was separated from the sports club in 1966 and reorganized as football club BFC Dynamo. BFC Dynamo eventually became the record champion of the DDR-Oberliga. The judo department was transferred to SC Dynamo Hoppegarten in 1966.

Dynamo-Sportforum
The Dynamo-Sportforum was a large multi-use sports complex in East Berlin that contained an athletic stadium, a gymnasium, a roller-skating hall, an ice rink and a velodrome. The Sportforum is still in operation and is now used by SC Berlin and BFC Dynamo, as well as junior teams of Eisbären Berlin, among several other tenants.

Controversies surrounding the Sports Club

The case of doping
Two former SC Dynamo Berlin club doctors, Dieter Binus, chief of the national women's team from 1976 to 1980, and Bernd Pansold, in charge of the sports medicine center in East Berlin, were committed for trial for allegedly supplying 19 teenagers with illegal substances. Binus was sentenced in August, Pansold in December 1998 after both being found guilty of administering hormones to underage female athletes from 1975 to 1984.

The Stasi and Erich Mielke
The president of SV Dynamo Erich Mielke was also the head of the Stasi from 1957 to 1989.  The Stasi was widely regarded as one of the most effective intelligence agencies in the world. The organization had 91,000 staff members and 174,000 unofficial collaborators by 1989.

End of East Germany
SV Dynamo was dissolved after the Peaceful Revolution. SC Dynamo Berlin was then renamed 1. Polizei-Sportclub Berlin on 21 March 1990. Harold Dimke became the president of PSC Berlin. PSC Berlin included departments in boxing, figure skating, speed skating, fencing, handball, judo, athletics, cycling, rowing, swimming, gymnastics, volleyball and judo. The department in judo was taken over from SC Dynamo Hoppeparten as a branch of PSC Berlin in Hoppegarten. The former ice hockey departement of SC Dynamo Berlin became independent as ice hockey club EHC Dynamo Berlin. Both PSC Berlin and EHC Dynamo Berlin were sponsored by the Ministry of the Interior of East Germany. 

PSC Berlin was renamed 1. SC Berlin on 23 April 1990. Sports club SC Berlin then emerged as the legal successor to 1. SC Berlin at the turn of the year. Several more departments became independent or joined other clubs. The former men's handball team of SC Dynamo Berlin joined SV Preußen Berlin and formed handball club HC Preußen Berlin. The men's volleyball players joined SCC Berlin and the women's handball players joined CJD Berlin. The focus of SC Berlin in the following years was swimming, figure skating and speed skating. Successful swimmers of the club during this period were Steffen Zesner, Daniela Hunger and Ingolf Rasch. Budō athletes of SC Berlin founded a new SC Dynamo Hoppegarten in 1996.

SC Berlin had 2,800 members as of 2021. The club has twelve departments in various sports and has produced numerous Olympic athletes of Germany. The sports club is still based in the Sportforum Hohenschönhausen.

Honours
SC Dynamo Berlin produced numerous well-known athletes, including Christoph Höhne (racewalking), Ilona Slupianek (shot put), Karin Janz (gymnastics), Axel Peschel (cycle racing), Joachim Ziesche and Dietmar Peters (ice hockey), Helga Haase (speed skating), and Barbara Krause (swimming).

References

External links

Official website of SC Berlin 

 
History of sport in East Germany
Sports clubs in East Germany
Dynamo Berlin
Berlin, SC
Dynamo Berlin
Dynamo Berlin
Dynamo Berlin
Dynamo Berlin
1954 establishments in East Germany
1991 disestablishments in Germany
Football clubs in East Germany
Dynamo
Multi-sport clubs in Germany
Berlin, Dynamo SC
Athletics in Berlin